Stefan Nils Edwin Johansson (born 8 September 1956) is a Swedish racing driver who drove in Formula One for both Ferrari and McLaren, among other teams. Since leaving Formula One he has won the 1997 24 Hours of Le Mans and raced in a number of categories, including CART, various kinds of Sports car racing and Grand Prix Masters.

Formula One career
Johansson's route to Formula One was via the British Formula 3 Championship, which he won in 1980 driving for future McLaren team boss Ron Dennis' Project Four team. In Formula One he participated in 103 grands prix, debuting on 13 January 1980 for the Shadow Racing Team at the 1980 Argentine Grand Prix when he was still a Formula Three regular. He failed to qualify for the race and the next race in Brazil and he was not seen in Formula One again until 1983, after spending 1982 in the European Formula Two Championship with Spirit Racing, where he finished eighth overall, his best finish being third at Mugello in Italy.

1983
Johansson's first Formula One race with Spirit was at the non-championship 1983 Race of Champions at Brands Hatch, where he failed to finish due to failure of the Honda engine on lap four. His qualifying time was almost 20 seconds off the pole time set by  World Champion Keke Rosberg in his Williams-Cosworth, but his times in the race morning warm-up session were within a second of the Ferrari 126C2B of René Arnoux, who was fastest. He moved up to seventh place before pulling into the pits with another engine failure. Anecdotally, then-BBC commentator Murray Walker said on air that Spirit and Honda had completed thousands of miles of trouble-free testing until that point. Spirit continued to test and develop the 201C and Johansson re-entered Formula One at the 1983 British Grand Prix at Silverstone where he qualified the car in a credible 14th position. He raced in a further five Grands Prix in 1983, with a best finish of seventh in the Dutch Grand Prix at Zandvoort.

1984

Stefan Johansson was replaced at Spirit by Mauro Baldi for the  season when the team lost its Honda engines to Williams and he didn't race until he joined Tyrrell in Round 10 of the championship, the British Grand Prix at Brands Hatch, as a replacement for the injured Martin Brundle. He then went on to drive for Toleman for the last few Grands Prix of the season in place of the injured Johnny Cecotto, finishing fourth in the Italian Grand Prix at Monza. While at Toleman, Johansson's regular teammate was future triple World Drivers' Champion Ayrton Senna.

1985–1986

Johansson signed a contract with Toleman for  but it fell through when Toleman failed to secure a tyre agreement. Instead Johansson started again with Tyrrell as a replacement for the suspended Stefan Bellof before being called up to Ferrari when René Arnoux was mysteriously sacked after the first race of the season in Brazil. At his second race with Ferrari, namely their 'home' race, the San Marino Grand Prix, two laps from home he passed Senna's out-of-fuel Lotus to take the lead to the delight of the Tifosi, and would probably have won if his Ferrari 156/85 had not run out of fuel itself just half a lap later. His role at Ferrari for the 1985 season was primarily to support Michele Alboreto's championship challenge, though he did finish second to the Italian at Canada, and backed it up with second in the next race at Detroit.

In  he often outpaced Alboreto, despite the Italian being the team's lead driver. The V6 turbo in the Ferrari F1/86 lacked nothing in power compared to the Honda, BMW, Renault and TAG-Porsche engines, but the car itself proved to be difficult, with both drivers complaining through the season about lack of downforce and the car's reluctance to drive well on all but the smoothest of circuits. Johansson finished fifth in the 1986 Drivers' Championship, his best-ever position, while Alboreto, who finished second in 1985, could only manage ninth place. There were many in Formula One, including highly respected then-BBC commentators Murray Walker and  World Champion James Hunt, who believed that Ferrari were sacking the wrong driver, given that the Swede had generally outshone his more highly-paid teammate throughout the season.

1987
McLaren weren't as competitive in 1987 as they had been in 1984–1986, with Prost only adding three wins to his tally (and beating the record of 27 Grand Prix wins held by Jackie Stewart with his 28th win in Portugal) and failing to successfully defend his Drivers' Championship. Further podium finishes did follow for the Swede and Johansson finished sixth in the Drivers' Championship. Johansson famously finished the 1987 German Grand Prix on three wheels having had a puncture on the last lap. He also finished second behind Prost in Belgium and added further podium finishes in Brazil, Spain and Japan. Despite 11 podiums in three seasons, Johansson was still winless and was not wanted by a top team (he had hoped to join Williams in 1988 as a replacement for the departing 1987 World Champion Nelson Piquet but Williams signed Riccardo Patrese instead). He did return to McLaren in a test-driver capacity in 1991, testing the Honda V12 engine at Suzuka in Japan.

1988–1991
He joined Ligier for 1988, ironically alongside the man he replaced at Ferrari, René Arnoux, but the team's first non-turbo powered car since , the Michel Beaujon-designed JS31 powered by a naturally aspirated Judd V8 engine, was totally uncompetitive, scoring no points and often failed to qualify, even against teams with much smaller budgets such as AGS and Rial (the French team's low point of the year was when both Johansson and Arnoux failed to qualify for the French Grand Prix at Paul Ricard in the first weekend of July). Unfortunately for Johansson, he failed to come to grips with the JS31, recording six non-qualifications during the season (compared to Arnoux who only failed to qualify twice). He did record the car's two best finishes of the year though, ninth placings in the opening race of the season in Brazil and the last race in Australia.

The car was temperamental and didn't always qualify, but Johansson finished a surprise and popular third in Portugal for his last (and the team's only) podium finish.

Johansson's record of podium finishes without a win was equalled by Nick Heidfeld at the 2009 Malaysian Grand Prix, who then took the record outright at the 2011 Malaysian Grand Prix.

In his 11-year Grand Prix career, in which he drove for 10 different teams, Johansson achieved 12 podiums (including 4 second places) and scored a total of 88 championship points.

CART career 
For 1992 he moved over to CART Championship Car, winning the Rookie of the Year title with two third places, ahead of Belgium's Éric Bachelart. His first pole came at Portland the next year, but as in Formula One he never won a race. From 1992 to 1996, he started 73 races and had his best season overall in 1994, finishing in 11th. During this time, he competed in the 1993–1995 Indianapolis 500. At the 1996 Molson Indy Toronto race, he was involved in an accident that claimed the life of fellow driver Jeff Krosnoff and track marshal Gary Avrin. After making wheel to wheel contact, Jeff's car hit the barriers and also a tree and lamp post that was too close to the track. Krosnoff died instantly of the injuries sustained from hitting the lamp post.

After Formula One: Sports Cars and team ownership
Before his Formula One career Johansson had participated in sports car races such as 24 Hours of Le Mans, and had won two World Sportscar Championship races in the 1980s (the Mugello round in 1983, driving a Joest Racing Porsche 956 with Bob Wollek, and the 1988 Spa Francorchamps race in a Sauber C9 with Mauro Baldi).

After retiring from CART at the end of the 1996 season he returned to this type of racing. During 1997 he recorded two major race wins, at the 12 Hours of Sebring driving a Ferrari 333 SP with Andy Evans, Fermín Vélez and Yannick Dalmas. Later in 1997 Johansson also won at Le Mans where he drove a TWR-Porsche WSC-95 for Joest Racing alongside his Ferrari F1 teammate of 1985 and 1986 Michele Alboreto, and young Dane Tom Kristensen. For Kristensen it was to be the first of a record (as of 2013) 9 wins in the famous French classic.

In 1997 Johansson founded a successful Indy Lights team running Fredrik Larsson and Jeff Ward; in 1998 its drivers were Guy Smith and Luiz Garcia Jr.; for 1999 the seats went to Scott Dixon and Ben Collins.

During 1998 and 1999 Johansson raced for various sports car teams (like the unreliable Audi R8C Coupé at Le Mans) but in 2000 he started Johansson-Matthews racing with an American businessman called Jim Matthews. They competed in the American Le Mans Series using a Reynard 2KQ prototype. Unfortunately this wasn't a successful vehicle in its original form (though it was later developed into various other successful cars including the Zytek that he later raced) and the partnership dissolved.

In 2001 Johansson campaigned an Audi R8 prototype with backing from Gulf Oil and the assistance of Mike Earle's Arena team. That year he raced in the European Le Mans Series, the American Le Mans Series and at Le Mans itself. His co-drivers were Guy Smith and Patrick Lemarie. At Le Mans Smith was replaced by Tom Coronel.

2002 saw Johansson back in an Audi R8 but this time one run by the Miami based Champion Racing team. His co-driver was ex Formula One driver Johnny Herbert and they competed in the American Le Mans Series.

For 2003, he returned to CART as a team owner, running American Spirit Team Johansson with Jimmy Vasser and Ryan Hunter-Reay as drivers. This was one of many new teams for the 2003 CART season; ironically, Bachelart's Mi-Jack Conquest Racing team was another. The team was under-funded, and although Hunter-Reay scored a fluke win in the wet conditions at Australia, it folded at the end of the season.

After only competing in a couple of celebrity races and occasional outings in the works Zytek in 2004 Johansson returned to full-time racing in 2005 driving the Chip Ganassi run New Century Mortgage sponsored Lexus Riley Daytona Prototype in the American Grand-Am Rolex Sports Car Series. With co-driver Cort Wagner he scored his best finish, a second place, at Mont Tremblant in Canada, they finished the year in fifth place in the championship.

In 2006 as well as the Grand Prix Masters series, Johansson has made occasional appearances in Grand-Am for the Cheever and CITGO teams, and has continued an association with the works Zytek team in the Le Mans Series.

2007 saw Johansson competing in a Highcroft Racing Courage-Acura in the LMP2 class of the American Le Mans Series, sharing with David Brabham. He was due to race a Zytek at Le Mans in 2007, but the team could not rebuild the car in time after a test-day accident, and Johansson made a last minute deal to drive a works Courage.

Johansson took part in the inaugural Speedcar Series in 2008, where luck once again deserted him as the victim of a lot of other drivers' accidents. For 2008 Johansson did not have a full-time sports car drive, but had some outings planned in the Highcroft Acura ARX-01 in the ALMS and a place with the Epsilon Euskadi team at Le Mans.

Outside the cockpit, Johansson has a number of business ventures (including managing several successful drivers such as Scott Dixon) and is a keen artist – he is particularly known for his watch designs. Also "Lill-Lövis" does expert commentary on Viasat Motor during Formula One races on occasion.

In 2011 he raced a Pescarolo-Judd in the Petit Le Mans 10 Hours and a Ford GT3 in the Malaysian 12 Hours at Sepang.

In 2012 he returned to the 24 Hours of Le Mans, racing a Lola B12/80.

Driver management
He is the manager of several racing drivers, including New Zealander Scott Dixon, fellow Swede Felix Rosenqvist (winner of the 2015 European Formula 3 Championship), Canadian Zachary Claman DeMelo, Romain Grosjean and Ed Jones.

In popular culture

Johansson was the inspiration for the song "Speedway at Nazareth" by Mark Knopfler.

Career results

Career summary

Complete European Formula Two Championship results
(key) (Races in bold indicate pole position; races in italics indicate fastest lap)

Complete Formula One World Championship results
(key)

 Did not finish, but was classified as he had completed more than 90% of the race distance.

Complete World Sportscar Championship results
(key) (Races in bold indicate pole position) (Races in italics indicate fastest lap)

Complete 24 Hours of Le Mans results

American open-wheel results
(key)

CART
(key) (Races in bold indicate pole position)

Indianapolis 500

Complete Macau Grand Prix results

Complete Grand Prix Masters results
(key) Races in bold indicate pole position, races in italics indicate fastest lap.

Complete FIA World Endurance Championship results
(key) (Races in bold indicate pole position; races in italics indicate fastest lap)

References

External links

 

1956 births
Living people
People from Växjö
Swedish racing drivers
Swedish Formula One drivers
Shadow Formula One drivers
Spirit Formula One drivers
Tyrrell Formula One drivers
Toleman Formula One drivers
Ferrari Formula One drivers
McLaren Formula One drivers
Ligier Formula One drivers
Onyx Formula One drivers
AGS Formula One drivers
Arrows Formula One drivers
Champ Car drivers
Indianapolis 500 drivers
Rolex Sports Car Series drivers
European Formula Two Championship drivers
British Formula Three Championship drivers
Grand Prix Masters drivers
American Le Mans Series drivers
24 Hours of Le Mans drivers
24 Hours of Le Mans winning drivers
Speedcar Series drivers
European Le Mans Series drivers
TC 2000 Championship drivers
Swedish expatriate sportspeople in the United Kingdom
Swedish expatriate sportspeople in the United States
World Sportscar Championship drivers
FIA World Endurance Championship drivers
Blancpain Endurance Series drivers
WeatherTech SportsCar Championship drivers
24 Hours of Spa drivers
12 Hours of Sebring drivers
Sportspeople from Kronoberg County
American Spirit Team Johansson drivers
Epsilon Euskadi drivers
Team Joest drivers
Arena Motorsport drivers
TOM'S drivers
Bettenhausen Racing drivers
Oreca drivers
Mercedes-AMG Motorsport drivers
Audi Sport drivers
Porsche Motorsports drivers
Highcroft Racing drivers
Cheever Racing drivers
Alan Docking Racing drivers
Sauber Motorsport drivers